The Abu al-Abbas al-Mursi Mosque is an Egyptian mosque in the city of Alexandria. It is dedicated to the 13th century Murcian Andalusi Sufi saint Abul Abbas al-Mursi, whose tomb it contains.

It is located in the Anfoushi neighborhood of Alexandria, near the Citadel of Qaitbay.

History 
Abul Abbas al-Mursi died in 1286 and was buried here. The mosque was first built in 1307.

The mosque was designed and built in today's current form by Eugenio Valzania and Mario Rossi in the years 1929/1945, and was highly influenced by Egypt's Old Cairo buildings and architecture.

It served in turn as a key source of inspiration for the much larger Sheikh Zayed Mosque in Abu Dhabi, completed in 2007 after more than a decade of building work.

See also
 List of mosques in Alexandria
 List of mosques in Egypt
 List of mosques in Africa
 Emir Abdelkader Mosque

References

External links

 Sacred Destinations Travel Guide Website "Abu al-Abbas al-Mursi Mosque, Alexandria"

Mosques in Alexandria
Mosque buildings with domes
Sufi mosques
Sufism in Egypt
Mosques completed in 1945
20th-century religious buildings and structures in Egypt